Lost Verses is the first compilation album by Australian deathcore band The Red Shore, released on 9 May 2009. It was released through Australian record label Stomp Entertainment and features re-recorded tracks from the band's past. The album was recorded in between tours in early 2009. Lost Verses was produced, recorded and mixed by the group's guitarist Roman Koester at Complex Studios in Melbourne, Australia. The album debuted and peaked at number 91 on the ARIA Albums Chart.

This would be the last release to feature founding member Jamie Hope.

Track listing
 "The Valentines Day Massacre" – 3:26
 "Sink or Swim" – 4:05
 "Flesh Couture" – 3:00
 "Knives and Wolves" – 4:09
 "Pulling Teeth" – 3:24
 "Effigy of Death" – 3:40
 "I Only Smile When You're Bleeding" – 2:57
 "Thy Devourer" – 3:44
 "What Doesn't Kill You" – 4:23

Personnel
 Jamie Hope – vocals
 Roman Koester – guitar
 Jason Leombrunni – guitar
 Jon Green – bass
 Jake Green – drums

Charts

References

The Red Shore albums
2009 compilation albums